Majengo is an administrative ward in the Singida Urban district of the Singida Region of Tanzania. In 2016 the Tanzania National Bureau of Statistics report there were 10,282 people in the ward, from 9,370 in 2012.

References

Wards of Singida Region